HOOKnSHOOT  was a mixed martial arts (MMA) promotion based in Evansville, Indiana, United States. It was one of the earliest MMA promotions in the United States, and one of the first organisations in the United States to allow Women's MMA.

History

HOOKnSHOOT was founded in 1995 by professional wrestling promoter Jeff Osborne. After watching the tapes of the early Ultimate Fighting Championships, he became interest in the nascent sport and sought to create his own event, forming HOOKnSHOOT at a gym the small town of Boonville, Indiana. The name was chosen derived from Japanese shoot wrestling and the wrestling term "Shoot", to give emphasis to the "realness" of the event. Early events used different rules: shootfighting (similar to Pancrase) and "NHB" ("No Holds Barred", similar to the UFC), HOOKnSHOOT also became promoter of Shooto events in North America for a time, even adopting its rules.

HOOKnSHOOT saw the introduction and beginning of many future MMA stars, such as UFC Middleweight Champion Dave Menne, UFC Heavyweight Champion Frank Mir and Antônio Rogério Nogueira, Ian Freeman, Ivan Salaverry, Hermes Franca, Chris Lytle, Travis Lutter, Gesias Cavalcante and Jeremy Horn.

In 2002 HOOKnSHOOT put on an all women's card labeled ‘Revolution’. It was headlined by Debi Purcell and Christine Van Fleet. In 2005 they held an all-women, one-night-only tournament featuring Julie Kedzie, Jan Finney, and Lisa Ellis. According to Osborne, he was inspired to promote women's matches after seeing her daughter and wife watch with interest tapes of Megumi Yabushita and other female fighters at the ReMix tournament in Japan. HOOKnSHOOT is considered the pioneer in Women's MMA, and Jeff Osborne has been referred as "The Godfather of North American WMMA".

In 2017, Jeff Osborne announced the close of HOOKnSHOOT, citing the lack of interest for local shows and financial incentives, as well his own age. HOOKnSHOOT did its last event March 4, 2017, titled HOOKnSHOOT - The Farewell Show. Thus ending the run of the second longest-running MMA promotion in North America.

Notable alumni
Lisa Ellis (UFC)
Jan Finney (Strikeforce)
Megumi Fujii (Bellator)
Julie Kedzie (UFC)
Tara LaRosa (Invicta)
Angela Magaña (UFC)
Nicdali Rivera-Calanoc (Invicta)
Miesha Tate (UFC)
Kaitlin Young (Invicta)
Yves Edwards (UFC)

References

1995 establishments in Indiana
Mixed martial arts organizations
Organizations established in 1995
2017 disestablishments in Indiana
Organizations disestablished in 2017
Defunct companies based in Indiana
Companies based in Evansville, Indiana